The 2003 1000 km of Le Mans was a one-off sports car event run under the organization of the Automobile Club de l'Ouest (ACO) in preparation for the Le Mans Endurance Series that began in 2004. It was run on 9 November 2003 at the Bugatti Circuit near Le Mans, France.

Development
The ACO, having previous helped in the creation of the American Le Mans Series with the running of the 1998 Petit Le Mans, as well as a failed attempt at a Japanese sportscar series with the 1999 Le Mans Fuji 1000km, created the 1000 km of Le Mans as an experimental event to gauge the desire for teams to participate in a European-based endurance sportscar series under Le Mans rules.

Previously, the FIA Sportscar and FIA GT Championships had run primarily in Europe, but were not running as a combined series, one concentrating on prototypes and the other grand tourers, and featured mostly sprint or middle-distance races.  Don Panoz, creator of the American Le Mans Series, had attempted to create a European series to combine the two types of sportscars with the European Le Mans Series, but had failed to gain enough entrants.  The ACO, weary of the same occurrence, decided to hold a single race to see how much participation there would actually be.

Although officially run under the Le Mans Endurance Series name, this did not count towards any championship.  In order to help bolster the number of entrants, the ACO promised winners in each of the four race classes automatic invitations to the 2004 24 Hours of Le Mans.

Unlike the usual 24 Hours of Le Mans run in June at the 13 km Circuit de la Sarthe, the 1000 km of Le Mans ran on the 4.3 km Bugatti Circuit which did not use closed public roads.

Official results
Class winners in bold.  Cars failing to complete 75% of winner's distance marked as Not Classified (NC).

Statistics
 Pole Position - #5 Audi Sport Japan Team Goh - 1:27.775
 Distance - 869.44 km
 Average Speed - 144.952 km/h

Post-Race
Following a successful turn out from a large number of European teams, as well as a handful of American and Japanese teams, the event was considered a success.  With this, the ACO pushed forward with their development of the Le Mans Endurance Series, debuting in 2004.  This move would also lead to the demise of the FIA Sportscar Championship, as prototype teams chose instead to participate in LMES.

Since this event, the LMES has not returned to Le Mans as part of their regular schedule, although many LMES participants race in the 24 Hours of Le Mans.

External links
 Racing Sports Cars - 2003 1000km of Le Mans

Le Mans
European Le Mans Series
2003 in European sport
November 2003 sports events in Europe